The Matrix is an American-British songwriting and record production team, consisting of Lauren Christy, Scott Spock, and Graham Edwards. In 1999, the production team took on their first project, the Jackson Mendoza song "Venus or Mars"; it was intended to be a one-off project. Christy, Spock, and Edwards enjoyed the songwriting and production process, which prompted them to form a production team. The team chose their name, the Matrix, as they wanted to remain in the background and allow the artists they work with to further stand out.

The Matrix's breakthrough came in 2002 with the release of Avril Lavigne's debut studio album Let Go, in which they co-wrote and produced five songs. Three of the songs became top ten singles on the Billboard Hot 100 chart ("Complicated", "Sk8er Boi", and "I'm with You") and their work with Lavigne collectively earned them seven Grammy Award nominations in 2003 and 2004. The success of these songs caused the Matrix to become a sought after production team, with the Matrix subsequently producing songs for artists such as Liz Phair, Britney Spears, Shakira, and Korn.

In 2002, the Matrix began work on their own studio album under Columbia Records. The production team recruited Adam Longlands (then known as A.K.A.) and Katy Perry to record lead vocals on the effort. A full album was recorded, several music videos were produced, and a tentative release date was set for the summer of 2004. However, the project was abruptly cancelled only weeks before its intended release. Following the release and subsequent success of Perry's second studio album One of the Boys (2008), the Matrix independently released their album under the title The Matrix on January 27, 2009.

Formation
In 1991, Lauren Christy and her then-husband Graham Edwards relocated to Los Angeles, California, in an effort to support her budding music career. Christy released two studio albums, including Lauren Christy (1993) and Breed (1997). In 1998, Edwards formed the electronic pop duo Dollshead with singer Sierra Swan. Scott Spock remixed one of the duo's songs, which ultimately resulted in Edwards asking Spock to join Dollshead. Spock accepted this offer and the group began writing songs together. In 1999, Dollshead's manager asked the group if they could write a song for Australian pop duo Jackson Mendoza. Christy and Edwards were apprehensive to accept this project, as they vowed to not professionally work together when they originally wed. The group, however, eventually accepted the project and wrote "Venus or Mars" for the duo. While this project was meant to be a one-time occurrence, the group decided to continue writing and producing together due to the song being well-received and their overall enjoyment of the process.

In reference to the production group's name, Spock explained: "We don't want to take the glory, which is why we took the name the Matrix, to be in the background, to make the artist's name stand out more".

Career

Writing and producing
The Matrix first came to prominence in the early 2000s for their collaborations with pop music artists such as Christina Aguilera, Busted, Myra, Hilary Duff, Avril Lavigne, Jason Mraz, Liz Phair, Ashley Tisdale, Shakira, Britney Spears, Miranda Cosgrove, and Tokio Hotel. They went on to co-write and produce metal band Korn's seventh studio album See You on the Other Side which sold over two million copies worldwide.

The Matrix

Prior to the formation of The Matrix, all three members of the production team worked as performers in their own right. With this knowledge, Columbia Records executive Tim Devine suggested to The Matrix that they record and release an album of their own. The production team desired to have an outlet to release their own music, although they also wanted to avoid media attention. As a result, they recruited Adam Longlands (then performing under the stage name A.K.A.) and Katy Perry to perform lead vocals on their album. The production team was already working with Longlands on several songs prior to inviting him onto the project. Perry was suggested to The Matrix by Devine after he was introduced to her by Glen Ballard. Devine was particularly impressed with Perry's vocals and overall charisma. When speaking on why The Matrix chose Longlands and Perry to join their team, Lauren Christy explained: "The reason we picked Katy and A.K.A. is they’re amazing performers. [Graham Edwards, Scott Spock, and I] like our role in the background and it shall continue to be there."

Development for the album lasted over two years, with the team forming tentative plans to debut the material in 2004. The planned lead single, "Broken," was set for release in the spring with the self-titled album following in the early summer. In February 2004, the Los Angeles Times revealed four song titles set for inclusion on the album: "Love Is a Train," "Damn," "Another Year to Come," and "Do You Miss Me". A full album was recorded, several music videos were produced, and there were plans for a heavy promotional album campaign. The album, however, was abruptly shelved several weeks before its intended release. The Matrix explained that they cancelled the project following their dissatisfaction with the time commitments of interviews and live performances, finding that these demands gave them less time to devote to music production. Ballard later commented that the project fell apart internally, with the team being unable to even agree upon a lead single.

Four years after the shelving of The Matrix, the production team formed plans to release the album in 2008 on their own record label, Let's Hear It Records. These plans, however, were delayed after Perry's debut single, "I Kissed a Girl," achieved international commercial success in April 2008. Christy reached out to Perry in regards to releasing the album, prompting Perry to ask the team to wait until the fourth and final single from One of the Boys (2008) was released. The Matrix was officially released on iTunes on January 27, 2009 by Let's Hear It Records. When speaking on the album, Christy commented: "We don't want to be pop stars, and we're not releasing it on a major label. And it's not called 'Katy Perry and the Matrix.' These are just great songs, and I'm very proud of it." The album failed to attain any notable commercial success, while it received mixed critical reception.

Accolades

The members of The Matrix are 7-time Grammy-nominated songwriters and producers and the recipients of the Ivor Novello Award for Best International Hit of the Year 2003 and BMI and ASCAP Songwriters of The Year 2004, as well as 2-time Canadian Juno winner for Pop Song of the Year and Album of The Year 2003.

Production and songwriting discography

References

External links
  The Matrix on Myspace
 "The Matrix Keeps the Faith". MusicWorld. January 27, 2004.
 Interview with Lauren Christy, HitQuarters Jul 06

American record producers
Record production teams